= Dhekaru =

Caste of India

The Dhekaru (Degaru) are a caste of India. There is no distinct Dhekaru language, despite once being assigned an ISO code [dgu].
